14 South African Infantry Battalion is a motorised infantry unit of the South African Army.

History

Origin
14 SAI was established on 1 January 1994, at Umtata, Eastern Cape as a result of the amalgamation of Transkei Defence Force into the SANDF.

Amalgamation
Another unit, 13 SAI was amalgamated with 14 SAI by the late 1990s.

Freedom of the city
14 SAI marked freedom of entry into Mthatha on 30 July 2011 in which the Mayor of King Sabata Dalindyebo Municipality, officiated.

Insignia

Previous Dress Insignia

Current Dress Insignia

SANDF's Motorised Infantry

SANDF's Motorised Infantry is transported mostly by Samil trucks, Mamba APC's or other un-protected motor vehicles. Samil 20,50 and 100 trucks transport soldiers, towing guns, and carrying equipment and supplies. Samil trucks are all-wheel drive, in order to have vehicles that function reliably in extremes of weather and terrain. Motorised infantry have an advantage in mobility allowing them to move to critical sectors of the battlefield faster, allowing better response to enemy movements, as well as the ability to outmaneuver the enemy.

Leadership

Notes

References 

Infantry battalions of South Africa
Infantry regiments of South Africa
Military units and formations established in 1994
United Nations Force Intervention Brigade